Suresh Chandra Roy was elected Sheriff of Calcutta for two consecutive years in 1957 and 1958. He was also awarded the Padma Bhushan, India's prestigious third-highest civilian award, for Trade and Industry in 1971. He further served on the Kolkata local board of the State Bank of India in 1957.

References 

Year of birth missing (living people)
Living people
Recipients of the Padma Bhushan in civil service